Brandon Lee McCoy (born June 11, 1998) is an American professional basketball player for the Sioux Falls Skyforce of the NBA G League. He played college basketball for the UNLV Runnin' Rebels. He stands 7’0’’ (213 cm) tall and plays center.

High school career
McCoy attended Morse High School in San Diego, California where he led the school to a state championship as a freshman before transferring to Cathedral Catholic High School in 2015.

Coming off the bench at the 2017 McDonald's All-American Game, he tallied 13 points, seven rebounds, four blocked shots and four steals in 20 minutes. He had a double-double of 15 points and 13 rebounds to go along with three blocks at the 2017 Jordan Brand Classic.

McCoy was rated as a five-star recruit and ranked #15 in the Class of 2017 by ESPN committed to UNLV in April 2017. He selected the Runnin’ Rebels over Oregon, Michigan State, and Arizona. In his senior season at Cathedral Catholic, he posted averages of 29 points, 13 rebounds and five blocked shots per outing.

College career
McCoy would make his collegiate debut on November 11, 2017, where he'd record 25 points and a season-high 18 rebounds in a blowout 108–66 win over Florida A&M University. On November 23, he would record a new season-high with 26 points and 17 rebounds in a blowout 85–58 win over the University of Utah. Two days later, McCoy would record a season-high 6 blocks to go with 15 points and 14 rebounds in a 101–82 win over Southern Utah University. On December 2, he would record a season-high 33 points with 10 rebounds grabbed in a close 91–88 overtime loss against Deandre Ayton (the eventual 1st overall pick in the 2018 NBA Draft) and the University of Arizona. Throughout his entire freshman season, McCoy averaged a team-high 16.9 points, 10.3 rebounds and 1.8 blocks per game, and was named Mountain West Conference Freshman of the Year. On March 27, 2018, weeks after UNLV lost their last game of the season to the rivals University of Nevada, McCoy would declare his entry into the 2018 NBA draft.

Professional career
McCoy was not selected by any team in the 2018 NBA draft, but signed a summer league deal with the Milwaukee Bucks shortly after. On July 31, 2018, he signed a training camp deal with the Bucks. On September 17, 2018, McCoy was waived by the Bucks. On September 29, 2018, the New Orleans Pelicans announced that they had signed McCoy. The Pelicans waived him on October 12. McCoy was added to the opening night roster of the Wisconsin Herd on November 1, 2018. On November 27, McCoy contributed 19 points, 14 rebounds, one assist and a block across in a 104-91 road loss to the Westchester Knicks. He averaged 7.3 points and 7.1 rebounds per game for the Herd. He was waived on February 19, 2020.

In January 2021, McCoy signed with Zlatibor of the Basketball League of Serbia. He averaged 10.2 points, 4.8 rebounds, and 1.2 blocks per game. He joined Caciques de Humacao of the Baloncesto Superior Nacional on July 7. On August 25, McCoy signed with Filou Oostende of the BNXT League and the Basketball Champions League.

Sioux Falls Skyforce (2023–present)
On February 8, 2023, McCoy was acquired by the Sioux Falls Skyforce.

National team career
He was part of the US roster for the 2017 FIBA Under-19 Basketball World Cup that captured a bronze medal.

Career statistics

College

|-
| style="text-align:left;"| 2017–18
| style="text-align:left;"| UNLV
| 33 || 33 || 28.8 || .545 || .333 || .725 || 10.3 || .5 || .5 || 1.8 || 16.9

References

External links
 UNLV Runnin’ Rebels bio
 Scout.com bio
 https://fiba.com/world/u19/2017/Brandon-McCoy FIBA bio

1998 births
Living people
American expatriate basketball people in Belgium
American expatriate basketball people in Serbia
American men's basketball players
Basketball League of Serbia players
Basketball players from San Diego
Basketball players from Chicago
BC Oostende players
Centers (basketball)
KK Zlatibor players
McDonald's High School All-Americans
Sioux Falls Skyforce players
UNLV Runnin' Rebels basketball players
Wisconsin Herd players